Agrilinus ater is a species of beetle in family Scarabaeidae, found in the Palearctic. It is a mid-successional species of sheep and cattle dung 

This species was formerly a member of the genus Aphodius.

References

Scarabaeidae
Beetles described in 1774
Taxa named by Charles De Geer